West1996 pt. 2 is the debut studio album by American rapper Lute. It was released on September 29, 2017, by Dreamville Records and Interscope Records. The album serves as the follow up to his first solo mixtape, West1996 (2012). The album features guest appearances from fellow Dreamville duo EarthGang, Cam O'bi, Elevator Jay, GQ Slaughter, and High I'm Ry.

Background
Lute originally intended to release the project as a free mixtape in 2014, but he said that he got a call from rapper J. Cole hours before releasing it, he said, Cole asked him to hold on to it for him, that he wanted to help him get the project into the right hands. Lute eventually signed to Cole's Dreamville imprint in 2015. The album experienced several push backs over the years due to sample clearances and other issues.

Lute spoke on the album within his Still Slummin documentary, he said:
 

Promotion and singles
On December 8, 2015, Lute's "Still Slummin'" appeared on Dreamville compilation album Revenge of the Dreamers II. The music video for "Still Slummin'" was released on October 17, 2017. On August 25, 2017, Lute released "Juggin'" as the second single, accompanied by a music video on August 28, 2017. On September 21, 2017, Lute revealed the release date of the album on Instagram, and released a mini documentary entitled, Lute: Still Slummin.

On September 26, 2017, "Premonition" featuring EarthGang and Cam O'bi was released. The music video for "Morning Shift" was uploaded on Vevo soon after the album's release.

Track listingWest1996 pt. 2

Notes
"Still Slummin'" features uncredited vocals by J. Cole.

References

2017 debut albums
Interscope Records albums
Dreamville Records albums
Albums produced by J Dilla